Kirktown ("church town") is the name of several places in Scotland:
 
Kirktown of Fetteresso, near Stonehaven, Aberdeenshire
Kirktown of Mortlach, in Dufftown, Moray
Kirktown of St Fergus, in St Fergus, Aberdeenshire

See also
Kirkton (disambiguation)
Churchtown (disambiguation)